This article summarizes the events, album releases, and album release dates in hip hop music for the year 2003.

Events

January
On January 24, Brazilian rapper Sabotage died in São Paulo

May
On May 19, Camoflauge died On May 19

October
On October 24, Half a Mill died in Brooklyn, New York City

November
On November 26, Soulja Slim died in Gentilly, New Orleans

Released albums

Highest-charting singles

Highest first-week sales

All critically reviewed albums ranked (Metacritic)

See also
Previous article: 2002 in hip hop music
Next article: 2004 in hip hop music

References

2000s in hip hop music
Hip hop
Hip hop music by year